Earlsboro is a town in Pottawatomie County, Oklahoma, United States. The population was 628 at the 2010 census, a decline of 0.8 percent from the figure of 633 in 2000.  It was once called "...the town that whisky built and oil broke."

History
The town of Earlsborough (as it was spelled on the town plat) began in 1891, when the Choctaw Coal and Railway (later the Choctaw, Oklahoma and Gulf Railroad) built a line west from the Seminole Nation into Oklahoma Territory.
The town was located one-half mile inside Oklahoma Territory. It was named for James Earls, a local African American who had served as an orderly for Confederate General Joseph Wheeler during the Civil War. The spelling of the town name changed when the Earlsboro post office opened on June 12, 1895.

The town had an economic boom from the outset because Indian Territory was legally "dry," but Oklahoma Territory was not. The first three businesses were saloons, and it was said that 90 percent of the merchants were engaged in liquor sales. By 1905, the town had a population estimated at 500.  Many customers were visitors from Indian Territory.

Statehood brought prohibition to all of Oklahoma, and the population of Earlsboro quickly dropped to 387. The local economy subsequently relied on agriculture instead of liquor. Oil was struck nearby on March 1, 1926. The first well produced 200 barrels a day. News of the strike attracted workers, and the town population increased to an estimated ten thousand people within two months. The ensuing boom led to construction of a one hundred thousand dollar hotel, a large theater, and many different kinds of business. In 1929, the town passed a $225,000 bond issue to construct a water and sewer system. The population was officially 1,950 at the 1930 census.

The oil boom turned into a bust when production declined precipitously in 1932. The newcomers, now deeply in debt, fled the scene, abandoning homes and businesses. The city went into bankruptcy, since it could no longer pay its debts. In 1959 the Daily Oklahoman reported that Earlsboro "was the town that whisky built and oil broke."  The population continued to decline until the end of the 20th Century.

On May 4, 2022, an EF2 tornado struck the southeastern part of town before looping around and striking the eastern half of the town, damaging homes, power lines, and buildings. An additional EF1 tornado began near the starting point of the first tornado, causing additional damage as it moved east.

Geography
Earlsboro is located at  (35.296927, -96.798305).

Demographics

As of the census of 2010, there were 628 people living in the town.  The population density was 68 people per square mile (26/km2).  There were 260 housing units at an average density of 27 per square mile (10/km2).  The racial makeup of the town was 70.46% White, 11.22% African American, 12.16% Native American, 0.32% Asian, 0.16% from other races, and 5.69% from two or more races. Hispanic or Latino of any race were 1.42% of the population.

There were 229 households, out of which 34.2% had children under the age of 18 living with them, 68.0% were married couples living together, 8.8% had a female householder with no husband present, and 19.7% were non-families. 18.0% of all households were made up of individuals, and 10.1% had someone living alone who was 65 years of age or older. The average household size was 2.78 and the average family size was 3.13.

In the town, the population was spread out, with 25.8% under the age of 18, 11.1% from 18 to 24, 25.6% from 25 to 44, 23.1% from 45 to 64, and 14.5% who were 65 years of age or older. The median age was 37 years. For every 100 females, there were 89.5 males. For every 100 females age 18 and over, there were 91.1 males.

The median income for a household in the town was $28,214, and the median income for a family was $32,396. Males had a median income of $30,956 versus $15,865 for females. The per capita income for the town was $12,488. About 11.3% of families and 12.6% of the population were below the poverty line, including 9.2% of those under age 18 and 20.7% of those age 65 or over.

Notable residents

 Oleta Crain, African-American military officer and federal civil servant
 Ernest McFarland, Governor of Arizona and Senate Majority Leader from Arizona
 Willie Stargell, Hall of Fame American baseball player
 Ival Goodman, MLB all-star
 Joe Liggins, R&B pianist
 Jimmy Liggins, R&B guitarist and brother of Joe Liggins

Notable events
The podcast Song Salad, with hosts Shannon and Scott (featuring special guest Abby Trott), covered the town of Earlsboro in episode 66 (June 2017). https://soundcloud.com/songsaladpodcast/ep-66-shinda-ushi-dead-cows

References

External links
 Encyclopedia of Oklahoma History and Culture - Earlsboro

Towns in Pottawatomie County, Oklahoma
Towns in Oklahoma